The fourth season of RuPaul's Drag Race began airing on January 30, 2012, with cast members announced November 13, 2011. The winner of season four headlined Logo's Drag Race Tour featuring Absolut Vodka, won a one-of-a-kind trip, a lifetime supply of NYX Cosmetics, and a cash prize of $100,000.

Like the last season, Santino Rice and Billy B (Billy Brasfield), celebrity makeup artist and star of the HGTV mini-series Hometown Renovation, shared the same seat at the judges table alternatively, Brasfield filling in for Rice when needed. Both judges appeared side-by-side in the audience during the "Reunited" episode.

The theme song playing during the runway every episode was "Glamazon" and the song played during the credits was "The Beginning", both from RuPaul's album Glamazon.

This is the first season in which a contestant, Willam Belli, was disqualified from the competition for breaking the rules and the second season in a row in which a contestant, Kenya Michaels, was brought back into the competition after having been eliminated in a prior episode.

The winner of the fourth season of RuPaul's Drag Race was Sharon Needles, with Chad Michaels and Phi Phi O'Hara as runners-up, making it the first time in the show's history to have two runners-up. The final also featured the first three-way lip-sync battle, instead of the usual two competitors. It was the first season in which the winner was not crowned in the studio but during the "Reunited" episode, which was filmed in front of an audience. This was also the first time three versions of the finale were filmed with each Top 3 contestant being crowned to prevent spoilers, this came after Raja winning Season 3 was leaked by Perez Hilton in 2011.

Contestants

Ages, names, and cities stated are at time of filming.

Notes:

Contestant progress

Lip syncs

 The contestant was eliminated after their first time in the bottom two.
 The contestant was eliminated after their second time in the bottom two.
 The contestant was eliminated after their third time in the bottom two.

Guest judges
Listed in chronological order:

Elvira, Mistress of the Dark, actress and television hostess
Mike Ruiz, photographer
Rick Fox, professional basketball player
John Salley, professional basketball player
Amber Riley, actress and singer
Natalie Cole, actress, pianist, singer and songwriter
Nicole Sullivan, actress, comedian, voice artist
Max Mutchnick, television producer
Loretta Devine, actress
Ross Mathews, comedian and television personality
Kelly Osbourne, television host and comedian
Pauley Perrette, actress, singer, and writer
Regina King, actress
Pam Tillis, singer and songwriter
Lucian Piane, composer and music producer
Pamela Anderson, actress
Jennifer Tilly, actress
Dan Savage, author
Jeffrey Moran, Absolut Vodka marketing/branding executive
Jesse Tyler Ferguson, actor
Jennifer Love Hewitt, actress and singer
Rose McGowan, actress
Wynonna Judd, actress and singer

Episodes

<onlyinclude>{{Episode table
|background = #A683EE |overall=5 |season     = 5 |title      = 23 |airdate    = 16 |episodes   = 

{{Episode list/sublist|RuPaul's Drag Race (season 4)
 |EpisodeNumber=45
 |EpisodeNumber2=8
 |Title=Frenemies
 |OriginalAirDate=
 | ShortSummary = For the mini-challenge, the queens must take a polygraph test. Based on these results, the queens are then paired up for the main challenge, which they must sing live in a duet. Chad Michaels and DiDa Ritz are paired up. Latrice Royale and Willam are paired up. Phi Phi O'Hara and Sharon Needles are paired up.

On the runway. Latrice Royale and Willam win the challenge. Phi Phi O'Hara and Sharon Needles are the bottom two and lip-sync to "It's Raining Men (The Sequel)" Performed by Martha Wash and RuPaul. After the lip-sync, RuPaul calls Willam to the front of the stage, saying that she has broken the rules, and will be disqualified immediately. Because of this disqualification, Phi Phi and Sharon both survive the lip-sync and remain in the competition.

Guest Judges: Lucian Piane, Pamela Anderson, and Jennifer Tilly
Mini-Challenge: Polygraph test administered by RuPaul
 Mini-Challenge Winner: N/A
 Main Challenge:  Live singing duet; the six remaining contestants were paired into three teams (duets) and sing "So Much Better Than You"
 Challenge Winner: Latrice Royale and Willam
 Bottom Two: Phi Phi O'Hara and Sharon Needles
 Lip Sync Song: "It's Raining Men (The Sequel)" Performed by Martha Wash and RuPaul
<span style="color:brown"> Disqualified: Willam</span>
 Farewell Message:' "Hi, I showed my ass (a lot) so here's one for the road. Willam." (with a butt print on the mirror.)
 | LineColor = A683EE
}}

}}</onlyinclude>

Marketing
In January 2012, Logo released the second running of Fantasy Drag Race, an online fan contest inspired by fantasy football where viewers assemble a team of three season four Drag Race contestants. Players receive and lose points based on their team's performance on the show, and can earn additional points by redeeming codes and performing tasks given out when episodes of the show first air. The highest scoring players receive Drag Race and NYX Cosmetics products, and one player wins a trip for two to the first stop on Logo's Drag Race Tour.

Already having a generous social media presence, Logo expanded its efforts across Facebook, Twitter, Tumblr, GetGlue, and Foursquare in preparation for the premiere of season four. Both RuPaul and contestants tweet live while the show airs, and LogoTalk! chat parties (featuring judges, contestants from previous seasons, and contestants from season four) occur on the official Logo website while participants watch new episodes. Season four specifically marks an increased interest from Logo in Tumblr, where the network publishes animated GIFs, contestant trading cards, and images that incorporate internet memes. Dan Sacher, VP of digital for VH1 and Logo, has stated that their online marketing efforts are part of helping the small network expand their fan base across as many outlets as possible.

Reception
The premiere episode of season four averaged a 0.6 rating in the 18-49 demographic, totaling 481,000 viewers, and ranked as the highest-rated premiere in Logo's network history. Untucked'' totalled 254,000 viewers, marking the companion show's most watched debut. During the evening of the premiere, the show registered eight US trending topics on Twitter (including Jiggly Caliente, Sharon Needles, Phi Phi O'Hara, and Latrice Royale) and reached a 7th place ranking on Trendrr. Leading up to the first episode, the show's Facebook page saw an 89% increase (earning over half a million fans).

The season finale scored a 0.7 rating in the 18-49 demographic and drew 601,000 viewers total, while the reunion episode became the highest rated episode of the season. Season four's "RuPaul's Drag Race: Reunited" was also the highest-rated reunion in the franchise's history, seeing a 33% increase in the 18-49 demographic compared to season three. The reunion registered five trending topics on Twitter (including Sharon Needles, Phi Phi, Willam, and a new portmanteau Willam introduced to the show: "RuPaulogize"), and ranked 4th among non-sports cable programs for the night on Trendrr.

During season 4, the show's Twitter following increased by 77%, and the Facebook page accrued a 36% increase in likes. TV.com also declared it was the best reality show on television.

References

External links
  (U.S.)
 Official website (Canada)
 Official Facebook page

2012 American television seasons
RuPaul's Drag Race seasons
2012 in LGBT history

de:RuPaul's Drag Race